Fakirhat Union is an Union Parishad under Fakirhat Upazila of Bagerhat District in the division of Khulna, Bangladesh. It has an area of 65.81 km2 (25.41 sq mi) and a population of 31,725.

Villages 
 Attaki
 Barasia
 Kathaltala
Pagalashamanagar
 Uttarapara
 Deyapara
 Shatshoiya
Bramhnrakadia
Jaria
Singati
Pikepara
Horaldanga

References

Unions of Fakirhat Upazila
Unions of Bagerhat District
Unions of Khulna Division